Diamante Eléctrico is a Colombian rock band formed in 2012. The band consists of Juan Galeano (vocals and bass), Daniel Álvarez (guitar) and Andee Zeta (drums). The band has released six studio albums and has received three Latin Grammy Awards, including Best Rock Album twice.

Career
The band was formed in 2012, with the three members, Juan Galeano, Daniel Álvarez and Andee Zeta, having previous experiences with music, Galeano studied Jazz in Rotterdam, Álvarez studied sound engineering in New York and Zeta had many years of background as a drummer, they met in one of Galeano's musical projects and then formed the band in 2012 in Bogotá, Colombia. Their first album Diamante Eléctrico was released in 2013 and was funded through crowdfunding in Kickstarter reaching over 5,000 dollars for the production of the album. The band won Best Rock Group at the SHOCK Awards in 2013 and received the award for Breakthrough Iberoamerican Artist by POTQ Magazine in 2014.

On March 17, 2015, the band released their second album B, it was recorded by Daniel Bustos in Bogotá and mastered by Gavin Lurssen in Los Angeles. The album won Best Rock Album at the 16th Annual Latin Grammy Awards while the song "Todo Va a Arder" was nominated for Best Rock Song. Their third album La Gran Oscilación was released on September 7, 2016, through Cinq Music and was produced by Joshua Vance Smith. The project was accompanied by the documentary Después de la Espera, which shows the production process for the album. At the 18th Annual Latin Grammy Awards, the album won Best Rock Album and the single "Déjala Rodar" won Best Rock Song.

In 2017, the band performed at the Coachella Festival. Their fourth album Buitres was released in 2018, the album was recorded at Nebula Studios in Bogotá and mixer at Electric Lady Studios in New York. The album was followed by Buitres & Co., released on 2019, which consists of new versions of the songs from Buitres with different guest singers such as Enrique Bunbury, Alison Mosshart, Rawayana, LosPetitFellas, Francisca Valenzuela and Kase.O from Violadores del Verso.

On February 11, 2021, the band released their sixth album Mira Lo Que Me Hiciste Hacer, the album was recorded during the quarantines due to the COVID-19 pandemic and had production from Andrés Rebellón and mastering by Gavin Lurssen, the project was dedicated to Daniel Bustos, who worked as engineer for the band's previous albums and died in 2020. The album received nominations for Best Pop/Rock Album at the 22nd Annual Latin Grammy Awards, as well as for Best Latin Rock or Alternative Album at the 64th Annual Grammy Awards, being the band's first Grammy nomination.

Influences
For their third album, the band found inspiration in the bands Led Zeppelin and Black Sabbath.

Discography
 Diamante Eléctrico (2013)
 B (2015)
 La Gran Oscilación (2016)
 Buitres (2018)
 Buitres & Co. (2019)
 Mira Lo Que Me Hiciste Hacer (2021)

Awards and nominations

Grammy Awards

Latin Grammy Awards

References

External links
Official website

Colombian rock music groups
Rock en Español music groups
Musical groups established in 2012
2012 establishments in Colombia
Musical groups from Bogotá